Canton Aerodrome  is adjacent to Canton, Ontario, Canada.

On August 13, 2022 a Piper Cherokee PA-28 crashed on takeoff from Canton Aerodrome, killing two persons. The Transportation Safety Board of Canada deployed investigators on August 14th to collect data, images and interviews with witnesses.

References

Registered aerodromes in Ontario